Veronica Mehta or simply Veronica is a singer and songwriter based in London, UK. She sings in English, Hindi and Punjabi.

Career
Aged 16, Veronica successfully auditioned for the part of female vocalist for the 2Kool album 2Kool Flavor. She was featured on the track "Sambhala Hai Meine". Veronica began her singing career when she teamed up with Rishi Rich to form VR1, a band and production unit that experimented with traditional Asian music, remixing, and giving vocals an R'n'B twist. VR1 sold more than 50,000 records in the UK and Europe and earned two Asian Pop Media Awards.

After VR1, Veronica joined ePark / Urbanstar and released the single "Girls Gotta Have Fun". Veronica has recorded a few tracks with her new management record company 2Point9, "Indian Girl" featuring Hard Kaur, and "U 'n' I (Mere Dil Vich Hai)", from the Yash Chopra film Hum Tum.

Veronica's first album, Theen, was released in 2005. "Hey Ya" (featuring Juggy D) was the only single released from the album. In 2006, Veronica won "Best Female Act" at the UK Asian Music Awards. After almost a 3-year gap, she released her third single "Soniya". Veronica released her second album, Rush, in 2010.

Veronica was affected by Breast cancer in 2016. She has taken initiative to end the stigma about  breast cancer in society.

Discography

Albums
Theen (2005)
Rush (2010)

Compilation appearances
 King of Hearts Queen of Hearts Vol.1
 King of Hearts Queen of Hearts Vol.2
 Love 2 Love 2000 - Chapter 6
 Playback
 Pure Garage - Chapter 1
 Pure Garage - Chapter 2
 Pure Garage - Chapter 3
 Playback 2
 Gift 2 U
 Let the Music Play - "2005"
 Bombay Mix - CD 1

As featured artist
 "U 'n' I" by Juggy D ft. Veronica and Rishi Rich
 "Ne Ajaa Ve" by H-Dhami and Mehta from Breakaway

References

External links
Veronica Mehta on Instagram 

English women pop singers
Living people
2Point9 Records artists
Year of birth missing (living people)
Singers from London
Musicians from Belfast
English people of Indian descent
People from Northern Ireland of Indian descent